This list of Ports and harbours in Eritrea details the ports, harbours around the coast of Eritrea.

List of ports and harbours in Eritrea

External links

References

Ports

Eritrea